Ashley Gibson (born ) is a former English professional rugby league footballer who plays as a  or er for the Newcastle Thunder in the Championship. He has played for both England & England A at international level, with his full England debut was v France in the inaugural Federation Shield on 22 Oct 2006.

He has previously played for the Leeds Rhinos, Salford City Reds, Castleford Tigers (Heritage № 946) and the Wakefield Trinity Wildcats (Heritage № 1370) in the Super League.

Background
Gibson was born in Leeds, West Yorkshire, England.

As a youth he played for Stanningley ARLFC.

Leeds Rhinos
He is also known to kick goals. He played only 29 times for Leeds over four years, despite scoring a hat-trick in his début, a 74-0 victory over the Leigh Centurions. A combination of limited first team opportunity and injury halting his chances in the first team.

Salford City Reds
He signed for Salford City Reds at the end of 2009's Super League XIV.

Bradford Bulls
RFL Championship side Bradford Bulls signed Gibson in June 2017 on a year and a half deal.

2017 - 2017 Season

He featured in Round 20 (Halifax) to Round 21 (Hull Kingston Rovers).

2018 - 2018 Season

Ashley featured in the pre-season friendlies against Halifax, Sheffield Eagles and Toronto Wolfpack.

Gibson featured in Round 1 (York City Knights) to Round 5 (Oldham R.L.F.C.) then in Round 7 (Coventry Bears) to Round 17 (Hunslet R.L.F.C.). He featured in Round 23 (Keighley Cougars) then in Round 25 (Oldham R.L.F.C.) to Final (Workington Town). Gibson also played in the 2018 Challenge Cup in Round 3 (West Wales Raiders) to Round 5 (Warrington Wolves). He scored against York City Knights (1 try), West Wales Raiders (2 tries), Coventry Bears (1 try), London Skolars (1 try), Hunslet R.L.F.C. (2 tries) and Oldham R.L.F.C. (1 try).

At the end of the season Gibson signed a 1 Year extension to his contract.

2019 - 2019 Season

Ashley featured in the pre-season friendlies against York City Knights, Huddersfield Giants and Batley Bulldogs.

Gibson featured in Round 5 (Toulouse Olympique) then in Round 8 (Leigh Centurions). Gibson also played in Round 17 (Leigh Centurions). He also played in the 2019 Challenge Cup in Round 4 (Keighley Cougars). He was released at the end of the season.

Statistics do not include pre-season friendlies.

Newcastle Thunder
On 25 Nov 2019 it was reported that he had signed for Newcastle Thunder in the RFL Championship

England
He gained national honours with the England A-Team, winning the Federation Shield.

References

External links

Bradford Bulls profile
Cas Tigers profile

1986 births
Living people
Bradford Bulls players
Castleford Tigers players
England Knights national rugby league team players
England national rugby league team players
English rugby league players
Leeds Rhinos players
Newcastle Thunder players
Rugby league centres
Rugby league players from Leeds
Rugby league wingers
Salford Red Devils players
Wakefield Trinity players